Sang-e Sefid (also Romanized as Sang-e Sefīd and Sang Sefīd) is a village in Cheshmeh Sar Rural District, in the Central District of Khansar County, Isfahan Province, Iran. At the 2006 census, its population was 634, in 160 families.

References 

Populated places in Khansar County